Saint Gregory the Illuminator Cathedral may refer to:

Armenia
Saint Gregory the Illuminator Cathedral, Yerevan

Brazil
St. Gregory the Illuminator Cathedral, São Paulo

Greece
St. Gregory the Illuminator Cathedral, Athens

Lebanon
Cathedral of Saint Elias and Saint Gregory the Illuminator

United States
St. Gregory the Illuminator Cathedral (Glendale, California)